Tamil television drama or Tamil serials are a genre of Tamil-language television produced in India, Sri Lanka, Malaysia and Singapore. All major TV networks in India produce a variety of drama series including family, comedy, romance, history stories, horror, devotional, fantasy stories and many others.

Tamil serial started to broadcast television series in the 1990s. Today's format of 100–500 episodes started in the 2000s. The television series industry has played a pivotal role in increasing Tamil popularity in India, Sri Lanka, Singapore and Malaysia. They are also broadcast in other parts of Asia, Africa, Europe, Australia and North America.

They are usually shown on Tamil television channels and start at 12 pm to 3 pm (afternoon), 6 pm to 8 pm (evening) and 8 pm to 11 pm (primetime and night). A series will run for about 3 or 4 years. It may air 5 or 6 episodes a week, the pattern usually being Monday through Friday or Monday through Saturday.

A channel usually airs 5 to 15 TV dramas simultaneously at any given time. Because they attract the most viewers, each channel competes for the most popular stars.

Format
Tamil television serials are usually helmed by one director, written by one screenwriter, thus having a distinct directing style and language, unlike American television series, where often several directors and writers work together. Series are likely to have only one season, with 1–500 or 1–1000 episodes. Mini series may be longer, with 100 to 200 episodes, but they also run for only one season.

The broadcast time for flagship dramas is 12 pm - 3 pm to 6 pm - 11 pm, with episodes on 5 to 6 consecutive nights : Monday–Friday or Monday–Saturday and weekends. Different dramas appear on each of the nationwide networks, Sun TV, STAR Vijay, Kalaignar TV, Colors Tamil, Zee Tamizh, Jaya TV, Raj TV, Polimer TV, Puthuyugam TV, Vendhar TV, Mega TV, Makkal TV, DD Podhigai, Shakthi TV, Vasantham TV, MediaCorp Vasantham, Astro Vaanavil, TV2 and Deepam TV. Dramas in prime slots are in the telenovella format, rarely running over 500 episodes.

Singapore and Malaysia 
The broadcast time for flagship dramas is 22:00 to 23:00, with episodes on Four consecutive nights: Mondays to Thursday, Friday, and weekends. Different dramas appear on each of the nationwide networks, Mediacorp Vasantham, Astro Vaanavil and Astro Vinmeen HD. Series are likely to have one to three season, with 1–80 episodes. Mini series may be longer, with 1 to 16 episodes, they also run for one to three season.

Some popular contemporary dramas include: Vettai, Nijangal, Vettai: Pledged to Hunt, Sundharam Kudumpathinar, Annamalai, Ragasiyam, Vetri.

Contemporary series

Series set in contemporary times usually run for one season, for 100–1000 episodes of 22 minutes. They are often centered on a family story, with love ties and relationships being in the focus. Characters are mostly idealised, with Tamil female protagonists described as the ideal women, and can focus on ethics and social issues in rural areas. The daily dramas are also usually set in contemporary times, describing a family conflict or family relationships, centered on Tamil women, who sacrifice themselves for family happiness.

Some popular contemporary dramas include: Shakthi, Chiti, Anandham, Kalki, Kasalavu Nesam, Annamalai, Metti Oli, Thangam, Thirumathi Selvam, Deivamagal, Kolangal, Azhagi, Athipookal, Uyirmei, Sembaruthi, Gayathri, Mella Thiranthathu Kadhavu, Thendral, Kana Kaanum Kaalangal, Office, Madhurai, Marmadesam and Kadhalikka Neramillai.

Music

Theme music and background music sets the overall tone of the Tamil series. Most series will start off with one to three minutes of opening theme music during the opening credits. Other series will have at the very least a catchy melody in the beginning, displaying the drama's name that lasts a few seconds, and then one to two minutes of ending theme background music during the closing credits. Background music is placed and used at strategic points of the episode to set the mood of that particular show.

Original soundtracks (OSTs) are made specifically for each series and play an important role in Tamil dramas (mostly in Singapore and Malaysia). They are generally recorded by professional playback singers and tend to enhance the reputation and popularity of dramas. OSTs help to heighten a situation, accentuate a mood, provide relief, or serve as background to an interior monologue.

Production
They are often mass-produced under large production banners, with companies like AVM Productions, Saregama, Radaan Mediaworks, Vikatan Televistas, Balaji Telefilms and In House Productions, running different language versions of the same serial on different television networks or channels.

Broadcast
Tamil TV dramas are popular overseas in countries such as India, Sri Lanka, Singapore and Malaysia. They are also broadcast in other parts of Asia, Africa, Europe and North America. The popularity of Tamil TV dramas in India markets is on the rise. Tamil serials are also dubbed in Malayalam, Telugu, Bengali, Kannada, Odia and Marathi and most serials air with English, Sinhalese and Malay subtitles.

India

Kerala
In the Indian state of Kerala, Tamil series are popular and broadcast at prime time, Kolangal and Anandham were aired on Surya TV. Some Tamil series have also been remade into Malayalam versions such as Parvathi in 2002 which was a remake of the serial Chithi and Nilavilakku a remake of Thirumathi Selvam. Surya TV and Asianet Plus are examples of Malayalam television networks that airs Tamil series.

Andhra Pradesh
In the Indian state of Andhra Pradesh, Tamil series have gained popularity and the Tamil series, Chithi, Kolangal, Anandham, Selvi, Arasi, Annamalai, Vasantham, Surya, Pasam, Chellamay, Kalyanam and Lakshmi were aired on Gemini TV, RVS TV, Zee Telugu and Vanitha TV. Some Tamil series have also been remade into Telugu language versions such as Devatha which was a remake of the serial Thirumathi Selvam, Aparanji a remake of Thangam, Sravani Subramanyam a remake of Thendral and Jabilamma a remake of Deivamagal.

Karnataka
Tamil series have also been remade into Kannada versions such as Rangoli was a remake of the serial Kolangal, Chikamma a remake of Chithi, Bangara a remake of Thangam, Thangaali a remake of Thendral, Mangalya a remake of Metti Oli and Chandra Chakori a remake of Deivamagal. The Udaya TV air Tamil series remade in the Kannada language.

Maharashtra
Tamil series have also been remade into Marathi. The Chennai-based Sun TV Network group started a Marathi GEC named as Sun Marathi in January 2021. It will be Sun group's fourth entry in South Indian market. Many shows like Nandini, Maya, Roja, Arundhati will be dubbed in Marathi language to reach towards peoples of Maharastra.

Sri Lanka

In Sri Lanka Tamil channels air Tamil series, and also dub and subtitle in the Sinhalese language. The first Tamil Language serial to be dubbed in Sinhalese was Chithi. Tamil television series are extremely popular in Sri Lanka, with ratings higher than the traditional Tamil Nadu TV series that Sri Lankan watched. Most Tamil serial airs in Tamil language with Sinhalese subtitle.

Singapore and Malaysia
In Singapore and Malaysia Tamil Channel airs Tamil Series and subtitle in the English language. Among the most popular series are Vettai, Nijangal, Ennuyire, Annamalai, Ragasiyam and Neeya.

Other countries
Tamil Series and television shows are also popular among the Tamil diaspora. Tamil television shows are aired on certain cable television channels in various countries such as the Malaysia, Singapore, Indonesia, the Philippines, the Middle East, North Africa, Réunion, South Africa, Mauritius, Seychelles, Fiji, Guyana, Burma, Trinidad and Tobago, the French West Indies, Europe, Australia, Canada and the United States.

Running time
An episode of a popular Tamil television drama from the 2010s is usually between 30 and 60 minutes in length (including advertisements), which is much longer than a typical episode of an Indian or Western European series.

List of longest-running Tamil Language television series
This is a list of the longest-running Tamil Language television series, ordered by number of episodes the show has aired. This list includes only programs aired five years and above.

See also
 List of Tamil-language television channels
 Lists of Tamil-language media in Malaysia
 Television in Sri Lanka
 List of Tamil soap operas
 List of Tamil soap operas currently airing
 List of Tamil-language films

Notes
3D
 Mayavi: It was the first Indian & Asian 3D series.

Guinness World Records
 Nadhaswaram: This serial on 5 March 2014 achieved the feat of being the first TV drama in Indian and Tamil television to be aired live. This was done to commemorate the show's 1000th Episode on 5 March 2014. By airing a 23-minutes 25seconds long live telecast in a single shot, the TV drama has earned a place in the Guinness World Records.

Popularity
 Marmadesam: It was an extremely successful tele-serial. It was ranked first in viewership among the television programmes telecast from Chennai in 1997.
 Chithi: It holds the credit of most watched regional Language television program in India ever.

References

 
Asian drama
Television genres
Television drama